Middle Classes: Their Rise and Sprawl was a six-part BBC documentary television series broadcast in the United Kingdom in 2001, narrated by Geoffrey Palmer.

It gained favourable reviews including from Will Self who said "No simple overview can do justice to this programme — an exemplary series and mandatory viewing."

In 2002 an accompanying book was published, written by the historian Simon Gunn and television producer Rachel Bell. The television series was repeated on BBC Four in 2007, but as of 2022 was not available to view on BBC iPlayer.

The series found renewed attention in 2022 with the launch of the Conservative Party leadership campaign of Rishi Sunak, who featured in the programme. Sunak, then a student at Lincoln College, Oxford, was interviewed with his parents in episode five, about their decision to educate him at the independent school Winchester College. Sunak said "I have friends who are aristocrats, I have friends who are upper class, I have friends who are, you know, working class butwell, not working classbut I mix and match." In the accompanying book Sunak says "I am very lucky to have been at these places, it does put me as an elite in society."

Episodes

References

External links

2000s British documentary television series
2001 British television series debuts
2001 British television series endings
BBC television documentaries